(born 23 December 1988), nicknamed , is a Japanese singer and dancer. She is known as one of the members of the electropop group Perfume.

Biography
Kashino was born and raised in Hiroshima, Japan, where she attended Actor's School Hiroshima with friends and current Perfume members Ayaka Nishiwaki and Ayano Ōmoto. She and Nishiwaki are the two original members of Perfume.

Kashino and Nishiwaki formed Perfume in 2001 with former member Yūka Kawashima, who left shortly after to focus on her schoolwork. Before Ōmoto joined Perfume after being asked by Nishiwaki, the two had not met.

Kashino graduated from Horikoshi High School. She subsequently enrolled into J. F. Oberlin University, as the member's master and graduated in March 2011. Ōmoto attended the same university, but dropped out by 2008.

Kashino is also friends with fellow singer Kyary Pamyu Pamyu.

On 18 April 2008 Perfume made a special guest appearance performing "Ceramic Girl" at the ending of drama "Sumire 16 sai!!".

On 23 March 2012 Perfume made a special guest appearance performing "Baby Cruising Love" in the movie "Moteki".

On 31 March and 1 April 2017 Kashino played the character "Okamido" on TV Tokyo Special drama 'Pensées'.

In September 2017, Kashino dubbed "the clerk" on "FASTENING DAYS 3" mini-series.

Kashino's regular page "Kokontozai: KASHIYUKA’s Shop of Japanese Arts and Crafts” on monthly magazine “Casa BRUTUS” started on the issue (No.217) hitting the stands on 9 March (Fri), 2018.

References

External links 

 Perfume official website
 
 

Living people
Horikoshi High School alumni
Japanese women pop singers
Japanese female dancers
Perfume (Japanese band) members
Musicians from Hiroshima
Japanese women in electronic music
1988 births
J. F. Oberlin University alumni